Group A of the 2001 FIFA Confederations Cup took place between 31 May and 4 June 2001. Japan won the group, and advanced to the knockout stage, along with group runners-up Brazil. Cameroon and Canada failed to advance.

Standings

Results

Brazil v Cameroon

Japan v Canada

Canada v Brazil

Cameroon v Japan

Brazil v Japan

Cameroon v Canada

References

A
2001 in Japanese football
Brazil at the 2001 FIFA Confederations Cup
2001 in Canadian soccer
2001 in Cameroonian football